Dinmukhamed or Dinmukhamet is a Kazakh masculine given name, its short version is Dimash. It may refer to

Dinmukhamed
Dinmukhamet Akhimov (born 1948), Kazakh actor, better known as Dimash
Dinmukhamed Kunayev (1912–1993), Kazakh Soviet politician

Dimash
Dimash Kudaibergen (born 1994), Kazakh singer

Kazakh masculine given names